Ondangwa Urban is an electoral constituency in the Oshana Region of Namibia. It was created in August 2013, following a recommendation of the Fourth Delimitation Commission of Namibia, and in preparation of the 2014 general election.  It had 23,233 inhabitants in 2016 and 17,967 registered voters . The constituency office is situated in Ondangwa.

Politics
Ondangwa is traditionally a stronghold of the South West Africa People's Organization (SWAPO) party. The following people, all SWAPO, have served as councillors of Ondangwa Urban (until 2013: Ondangwa) constituency:
 Prinse Shiimi (1992–1998)
 Ismael Uugwanga (1999–2010)
 Alfeus Abraham (2011–2013)
 Elia Irimari (2014–2020)
 Leonard Egonga (since 2020)

The 2015 regional elections were won by Elia Irimari   (SWAPO) with 1,518 votes, far ahead of Vincent Asser of the Democratic Turnhalle Alliance (DTA) with 232 votes and Anna Nikanor of the Rally for Democracy and Progress with 117 votes. The SWAPO candicate als won the 2020 regional election, albeit by a much smaller margin. Leonard Negonga won with 2,921 votes over Olavi Negonga of the Independent Patriots for Change (IPC), an opposition party formed in August 2020, with 2,434 votes. Independent candidate Angelina Immanuel came third with 525 votes.

See also
 Administrative divisions of Namibia

References

Constituencies of Oshana Region
States and territories established in 2013
2013 establishments in Namibia